Maximo Nelson (born April 21, 1982 in Santo Domingo, Dominican Republic) is a professional baseball pitcher who is currently a free agent. Nelson played for Chunichi Dragons of Nippon Professional Baseball from 2008 to 2012.

Career
Nelson played baseball in the Dominican from 2001 to 2003. In 2004, he signed with the New York Yankees, and posted a 6-3 win–loss record of the GCL Yankees in 2004. Nelson was subsequently deported and banned from reentering the United States after being involved in a marriage-for-visa scam. Nelson played for the Modi'in Miracle of the Israel Baseball League. In 2008, Nelson signed with Chunichi Dragons.

Personal life
Nelson is of Haitian descent.

References

External links

1982 births
Living people
Cardenales de Lara players
Chunichi Dragons players
Dominican Republic expatriate baseball players in Israel
Dominican Republic expatriate baseball players in Japan
Dominican Republic expatriate baseball players in Mexico
Dominican Republic expatriate baseball players in the United States
Dominican Republic people of Haitian descent
Dominican Summer League Yankees players
Estrellas Orientales players
Gigantes del Cibao players
Gulf Coast Yankees players
Israel Baseball League players
Mexican League baseball pitchers
Navegantes del Magallanes players
Nippon Professional Baseball pitchers
Rieleros de Aguascalientes players
Sportspeople from Santo Domingo
Tigres del Licey players
Dominican Republic expatriate baseball players in Venezuela
Toros del Este players